Helen Norfolk (born 27 August 1981 in Christchurch) is a New Zealand swimming competitor. She won a bronze medal with Lauren Boyle, Alison Fitch and Melissa Ingram in the 4 × 200 m freestyle relay at the 2006 Commonwealth Games.

She has competed at three Olympic Games (2000, 2004 & 2008) and two Commonwealth Games (1998 & 2006).

References

1981 births
Living people
New Zealand female swimmers
Olympic swimmers of New Zealand
Commonwealth Games bronze medallists for New Zealand
Swimmers at the 2000 Summer Olympics
Swimmers at the 2004 Summer Olympics
Swimmers at the 2008 Summer Olympics
Swimmers at the 1998 Commonwealth Games
Swimmers at the 2006 Commonwealth Games
Swimmers from Christchurch
Commonwealth Games medallists in swimming
Universiade medalists in swimming
Universiade silver medalists for New Zealand
New Zealand female freestyle swimmers
Medalists at the 2005 Summer Universiade
21st-century New Zealand women
Medallists at the 2006 Commonwealth Games